Hamam (हमाम) Mango, Imam Pasand or Himayat or Himam Pasand is a lesser known and exclusive mango cultivar, grown in Srirangam, Tamil Nadu in India.  The names suggest regal origins and it is said to have been the fruit of choice for India's royalty.

It is a large, not too attractive looking mango, mottled green that lightens to blotched yellow-green as it ripens. It is available only during the months of May and June and each mango could grow up to 400 grams to 1000 grams in weight.

It is prized by connoisseurs for its unique taste and it has been considered as the 'King of Mangoes'.

Many mangoes are initially sweet and incredibly rich smoothness of its aftertaste. The Imam Pasand's aftertaste is quite different, with hints of coconut and lime, a brightly spicy-sour Thai curry to the suave Mughlai curry richness of Alphonsos.
A bite into one of these mangoes will reveal a tangy outer layer that hides the sweet flesh inside.

Hamam have a notably soft skin, easy to bite through or even eat, and this also makes it hard to transport. Modern retail systems seem to be cracking how to acquire and distribute them carefully enough and this combined with a wider cultivation area has resulted in increased availability at retail stores 

The origin of the prized variety's Hindi name is lost in the mists of time. Some say it was originally grown in Kerala and beloved of Mughal emperor Humayun (and was locally called Humayun Pasand). This fruit known as Himayat in Andhra was supposedly introduced in Tamil Nadu by the family that owns the Thathachariar gardens, a  sprawling estate at Srirangam, Tiruchirappalli.

References 

Mango cultivars
Mango cultivars of India